The CASA 2.111 was a medium bomber derived from the Heinkel He 111 and produced in Spain under licence by Construcciones Aeronáuticas SA (CASA). The 2.111 models differed significantly in details from Heinkel's wartime He 111H design while using essentially the same exact airframe in appearance, featuring heavier armament and eventually Rolls-Royce Merlin engines.

Design and development
In 1937, during the Spanish Civil War, the Spanish Nationalist Air Force received a number of He 111Bs from Germany, which had begun to receive the improved He 111D model, receiving He 111Es following the end of the war. There was a need for more modern aircraft, however, so in 1940, CASA negotiated a contract with Heinkel to produce 200 examples of the newer He 111 H-16 in Seville. Setting up production was slow, with relatively little support received from Germany as World War II continued. Spain managed to locate a store of Jumo 211F-2 engines in France, and this allowed completion of 130 Jumo powered examples (although only 117 were delivered owing to the need to cannibalise engines). These were in three versions: the 2.111A, a medium bomber; the 2.111C, a reconnaissance bomber; and the 2.111F, a dual-control trainer.

Operational history
The first Spanish-built aircraft flew on 23 May 1945. Following the end of the war, access to the German-built Junkers engines became an issue, and CASA found an alternative with the Rolls-Royce Merlin 500. In April 1956, 173 Merlin engines were ordered and installed on the aircraft in a "power plant" nacelle of a type originally developed by Rolls-Royce for the Beaufighter II and later used on the Avro Lancaster.  The newly Merlin-powered bombers and reconnaissance bombers became the 2.111B and 2.111D, respectively; some were re-engined, while others were built new. A nine-passenger transport, the 2.111T8, was also developed and produced. Spanish 2.111s served into the late 1960s and, in the case of the transports, early 1970s. Many of the aircraft retired in the 1960s.

The CASA 2.111 was used in combat in the close air support role during the Ifni War in 1957–1958.

In film

Due to their resemblance to He-111s, 2.111s were sometimes used as He-111 doubles in films. They were used in this way in films such as Battle of Britain and Patton. The Spanish-built version of a German fighter, the Hispano Aviación HA-1112 fighter (Messerschmitt Bf 109), often appeared alongside it in film.

Variants

2.111A Licensed He 111H-16 with Junkers Jumo 211 engines

2.111B Engines replaced by Rolls-Royce Merlin Series 500-29 engines

2.111C Reconnaissance variant

2.111D Reconnaissance variant with Merlin engines

2.111E Transport variant

2.111F Trainer aircraft

Accidents and incidents
One modified Spanish 2.111D served as a transport for Spanish VIPs, including General Francisco Franco, before being purchased in England by the Commemorative Air Force in 1977. It remained the last He 111 in flyable condition until 10 July 2003, when it was destroyed in a fatal crash landing. The aircraft was attempting a landing at the Cheyenne Municipal Airport, near Cheyenne, Wyoming, while en route from Midland, Texas to an air show in Missoula, Montana. Eyewitness reports indicate the aircraft lost power to one engine on final approach and ploughed through a chain link fence before colliding with a building under construction. Killed were CAF pilot Neil R. Stamp and co-pilot Charles S. Bates.

Surviving aircraft

 B.2I-27 – 2.111E on display at the Cavanaugh Flight Museum in Addison, Texas.
 B.2I-29 – 2.111D in storage at the National Museum of the United States Air Force in Dayton, Ohio.
 B.2I-39 – 2.111B in storage at the Flying Heritage & Combat Armor Museum in Everett, Washington.
 B.2I-77 – 2.111B on display at the Flugwerft Schleissheim branch of the Deutsches Museum in Oberschleißheim, Bavaria.
 B.2I-82 – 2.111B on static display at the Technik Museum Sinsheim in Sinsheim, Baden-Württemberg.
 B.2I-97 – 2.111E on display at the Museo del Aire in Madrid.
 B.2I-103 – 2.111B under restoration at the Kent Battle of Britain Museum in Hawkinge, Kent.
 B.2I-117 – 2.111B on display at the Militärhistorisches Museum Flugplatz Berlin-Gatow in Gatow, Berlin.
 BR.2I-14 – 2.111D on display at Flugausstellung Peter Junior in Hermeskeil, Rhineland-Palatinate.
 BR.2I-37 – 2.111D in storage in Duxford, Cambridgeshire for the Flying Heritage & Combat Armor Museum.
 BR.2I-129 – 2.111D on display at the Musée de l’air et de l’espace in Le Bourget, Île-de-France.
 Composite – Composite in storage in Austria. It is made up of the forward fuselage and center section of 2.111B, serial number B.2I-20, and the wreckage of He 111 H-16, werk nummer 2117.

Specifications (2.111B)

See also

References

Notes

Bibliography

 Cruz, Gonzalo Avila. "Homegrown 'Pedros': Spanish-Built Heinkel He 111s: Part One-Jumo Variants". Air Enthusiast, No. 90, November/December 2000, pp. 48–53. Stamford, UK:Key Publishing.  ISSN 0143-5450.
 Cruz, Gonzalo Avila. "Homegrown 'Pedros': Spanish-Built Heinkel He 111s: Part Two-Merlin Variants". Air Enthusiast, No. 91, January/February 2001, pp. 8–18. Stamford, UK:Key Publishing. ISSN 0143-5450.
 Lambert, C.M. "Handling the Spanish Heinkel 111". Flight, 17 August 1956, pp. 247–248.

External links

 Photo of a CASA 2.111 at the Museo de Aeronáutica y Astronáutica

2.111
1940s Spanish bomber aircraft
Low-wing aircraft
Heinkel aircraft
Aircraft first flown in 1945
Twin piston-engined tractor aircraft
Germany–Spain relations